The CEV qualification for the 2006 FIVB Women's Volleyball World Championship saw member nations compete for seven places at the finals in Japan.

Draw
27 CEV national teams entered qualification. The teams were distributed according to their position in the FIVB Senior Women's Rankings as of 15 January 2004 using the serpentine system for their distribution. (Rankings shown in brackets) Teams ranked 1–6 did not compete in the first and second rounds, and automatically qualified for the third round. Teams ranked 7–12 did not compete in the first round, and automatically qualified for the second round.

First round

Second round

Third round

Playoff round

First round

Pool A
Venue:  English Institute of Sport, Sheffield, England
Dates: January 12–16, 2005
All times are Greenwich Mean Time (UTC±00:00)

|}

|}

Pool B
Venue:  Pavilhão Desportivo Municipal, Santo Tirso, Portugal
Dates: May 4–8, 2005
All times are Western European Summer Time (UTC+01:00)

|}

|}

Pool C
Venue:  Palais Omnisports Joseph Claudel, Saint-Dié-des-Vosges, France
Dates: April 27 – May 1, 2005
All times are Central European Summer Time (UTC+02:00)

|}

|}

Second round

Pool D
Venue:  Sports Palace, Baku, Azerbaijan
Dates: May 27–29, 2005
All times are Azerbaijan Summer Time (UTC+05:00)

|}

|}

Pool E
Venue:  Makis Liougas Indoor Hall, Athens, Greece 
Dates: June 10–12, 2005
All times are Eastern European Summer Time (UTC+03:00)

|}

|}

Pool F
Venue:  , Zagreb, Croatia
Dates: June 11–13, 2005
All times are Central European Summer Time (UTC+02:00)

|}

|}

Third round

Pool G
Venue:  Dynamo Sports Palace, Moscow, Russia
Dates: July 1–3, 2005
All times are Moscow Daylight Time (UTC+04:00)

|}

|}

Pool H
Venue:  Atatürk Sport Hall, Ankara, Turkey
Dates: August 5–7, 2005
All times are Eastern European Summer Time (UTC+03:00)

|}

|}

Pool I
Venue:  MZH, Dresden, Germany
Dates: June 17–19, 2005
All times are Central European Summer Time (UTC+02:00)

|}

|}

Playoff round
Venue:  DKS Arena, Varna, Bulgaria
Dates: August 19–21, 2005
All times are Eastern European Summer Time (UTC+03:00)

|}

|}

References

External links
 2006 World Championship Qualification

2006 FIVB Volleyball Women's World Championship
2005 in volleyball
FIVB Volleyball World Championship qualification